Gonçalo Miguel Reyes Dias (born 30 January 1993) is a Portuguese footballer who plays for CD Operário, as a midfielder.

Career
Born in Cova da Piedade, Almada, to a mother from Chile, Reyes spent most of his youth career in the ranks of S.L. Benfica and concluded it at Vitória FC. He made his debut in the Primeira Liga on 6 January 2012 in a 1–1 home draw with Académica de Coimbra, as a substitute for the last eight minutes in place of Bruno Gallo.

After 18 months on loan at Casa Pia A.C. in the third tier, Reyes signed for C.S. Marítimo B of the Segunda Liga on 31 July 2014. On 1 November, he scored his only professional goal in a 2–1 home win over S.C. Covilhã.

Marítimo B were relegated in Reyes' first season, and he continued to play for them in the third, where he would go on to represent CD Operário, C.D. Pinhalnovense, G.S. Loures and S.C. Ideal.

Internationally, Reyes played three games for Portugal at under-16 level.

References

External links

1993 births
Sportspeople from Almada
Living people
Portuguese footballers
Association football midfielders
Primeira Liga players
Vitória F.C. players
Casa Pia A.C. players
Liga Portugal 2 players
CD Operário players
C.D. Pinhalnovense players
GS Loures players
Segunda Divisão players
Portugal youth international footballers
Portuguese people of Chilean descent